The Yugoslav Olympic medalists are athletes who competed and won medals for various Yugoslav entities at the Summer and Winter Olympic games between 1920 and 2002. While being part of Yugoslavia, athletes represented three distinct national entities; the Kingdom of Yugoslavia (1920–1936), and the Socialist Federal Republic of Yugoslavia (1948–1988) and the FR Yugoslavia (1994–2002). Yugoslavia was a multinational state with six constitutive ethnic groups; Muslims (e.g. Bosniaks), Croatians, Macedonians, Montenegrins, Serbs and Slovenes, and significant ethnic minorities in Vojvodina (Hungarians) and Kosovo (Albanians). Before the formation of the Kingdom of Yugoslavia in 1918, athletes from the region mostly represented Austria or Hungary, with the sole exception being the 1912 Summer Olympics when a small team of two athletes competed for the Kingdom of Serbia.

Because of the breakup of Yugoslavia in 1991 and 1992, Olympic participation changed. Newly independent Croatia and Slovenia sent their own delegations to the 1992 Winter Olympics, with Yugoslavia represented by athletes from Bosnia and Herzegovina, Macedonia, Montenegro and Serbia.  

The Federal Republic of Yugoslavia was established in April 1992, consisting of the Republic of Montenegro and the Republic of Serbia. However, United Nations Security Council Resolution 757 (adopted May 30, 1992) called upon states to: 
Despite this, the International Olympic Committee decided unanimously that athletes from Serbia and Montenegro (and also Macedonia) could compete in the 1992 Summer Olympics in Barcelona.  The conditions imposed were that the athletes would compete as Independent Olympic Participants (IOP), wear white clothing without distinctive signs, and use the Olympic Anthem and Olympic flag in victory ceremonies. The athletes could not participate at the opening and closing ceremonies of the games.

A team of 52 athletes competed in individual events, with three medals won in shooting. The restriction for individual athletes meant that the men's water polo team, the women's basketball team, and the men's and women's handball teams could not compete, despite having qualified for the Games.

Athletes, who has represented Yugoslavia, has won a total of 52 individual Olympic medals (16 gold, 16 silver and 20 bronze) between 1920 and 1988. The majority were won at the Summer Olympics, with only three medals (two silver and one bronze) won at the Winter Olympics. Leon Štukelj has won the most individual Olympic medals with three gold, one silver and one bronze in gymnastics. He was also part of the bronze medal winning men's gymnastics team during the 1928 Summer Olympics, making him the most successful  Yugoslav athlete in history. Gymnast Miroslav Cerar is the only other athlete with more than one individual gold medal, having won a total of two gold and one bronze medals. Jasna Šekarić is the most successful female Yugoslav athlete with one gold, two silver and one bronze medals in shooting, followed by Đurđica Bjedov, Aleksandra Ivošev and Mateja Svet .

In team events, Yugoslavia has won a total of 35 Olympic medals (10 gold, 16 silver and nine bronze). The most successful team was the men's water polo team, with a combined total of seven medals (three gold and four silver). Similarly successful were the men's handball team (two gold, one bronze) and the men's football and basketball teams with five medals each (one gold, three silver and one bronze). Women's teams shared similar success with the women's handball team winning one gold and one silver and the women's basketball team with one silver and one bronze medals. The only Yugoslav team with a medal from the Winter Olympics was the men's ski jumping team that won silver at the 1988 Winter Olympics.

Olympic medalists

The ranking in the tables below are based on information provided by the International Olympic Committee (IOC) and is consistent with IOC convention in its published medal tables.

Individual

Medals per region
The table shows the number of individual Yugoslav Olympic medals, won per region. Regions used are the Republics that were in use since 1944. All six Socialist Republics have since become fully independent nations and are members of the International Olympic Committee (IOC). The table uses place of birth of the athletes to determine the number of medals per region and not their nationality or ethnic group.

Team

Footnotes

See also
 Olympic Committee of Bosnia and Herzegovina
 Croatian Olympic Committee
 Macedonian Olympic Committee
 Montenegrin Olympic Committee
 Olympic Committee of Serbia
 Slovenian Olympic Committee
 Yugoslav Olympic Committee
 International Olympic Committee

References
General

Specific

Yugoslav
Medals
Olympics
Olympic medalists